Top Finance Bank Limited (TFBL), is a credit institution (Tier II Financial Institution) in Uganda. It is licensed and supervised by the Bank of Uganda, the central bank and national banking regulator.

Location
The headquarters of TFBUL are located at 3 Dundas Road, in the neighborhood of Kololo, in Kampala, Uganda's capital and largest city. The coordinates of the headquarters of this financial institution are 0°19'22.0"N, 32°35'44.0"E.

Overview
Top Finance Bank Limited is a Tier II Financial Institution (MFI), licensed by the Bank of Uganda, the central bank and national banking regulator. As a credit institution, it is not authorized to offer checking accounts or deal in foreign exchange. The company is authorized to take in customer deposits and to establish savings accounts. It is also authorized make collateralized and non-collateralized loans to savings and non savings customers.

As of December 2021, the bank had assets valued at Shs11.6 billion (approx. US$3 million), with Shs12.1 billion (approx. US$3.1 million), in customer deposits.

History
This credit institution was founded in 2012. It was licensed in September 2014 by the Bank of Uganda.

Ownership
From inception in 2012, the institution was privately owned by the founders, who trace ancestry to China. In August 2022, Salaam African Bank, a commercial bank based in Djibouti, acquired Top Finance Bank at an undisclosed price. Salaam Bank also maintains subsidiaries in Kenya and maintains a representative office in Ethiopia.

Branch network
The branch network of TFBL has included the following locations:
 Kampala Road Branch, Plot 53, Kampala Road, Kampala. Main Branch

Governance and management
The bank is directed by a five-person board of directors, chaired by Mrs. Brendah N. Mpanga. Michael Mande, a technology professional, enthusiast and banker, serves as the Managing Director and Chief Executive Officer. He leads a team of seven senior managers, responsible for the day-to-day management of the institution's affairs.

See also

 Banking in Uganda
 List of banks in Uganda

References

External links
 Website of Top Finance Bank Limited
 Uganda: Top Finance Bank Uganda Acquired By Djibouti's SAB As of 9 August 2022.

 

Banks of Uganda
Banks established in 2012
2012 establishments in Uganda
Kampala District